Winfred Addy (born 17 March 1973) is a Ghanaian table tennis player. He competed in the 1996 Summer Olympics.

References

1973 births
Living people
Table tennis players at the 1996 Summer Olympics
Olympic table tennis players of Ghana
Ghanaian male table tennis players